The 1946 New Mexico Conference football season was the season of college football played by the member schools of the New Mexico Conference (NMC), later renamed the Frontier Conference, as part of the 1946 college football season. Adams State of Alamosa, Colorado, led by head coach Neal Mehring, compiled a 5–1 record and won the NMC championship.

Conference overview

Teams

Adams State

The 1946 Adams State Grizzlies football team was an American football team that represented Adams State Teachers College (now known as Adams State University) as a member of the New Mexico Conference (NMC) during the 1946 college football season. In their first season under head coach Neal Mehring, the team compiled a 5–1 record, won the NMC championship, and outscored opponents by a total of 125 to 53.

New Mexico State Teachers
The 1946 New Mexico State Teachers Mustangs football team represented New Mexico State Teachers College of Silver City, New Mexico, during the 1946 college football season. Led by head coach Raymond J. Brancheau, the Mustangs compiled a 4–5 record (3–1 against NMC opponents), finished second in the NMC, and were outscored by a total of 121 to 75.

New Mexico Military
The 1946 New Mexico Military Broncos football team represented New Mexico Military Institute of Roswell, New Mexico, during the 1946 college football season. Led by head coach Major L.T. Godfrey, the Broncos compiled a 3–4 record (2–2 against NMC opponents), finished third in the NMC, and were outscored by a total of 149 to 107.

Eastern New Mexico
The 1946 Eastern New Mexico Greyhounds football team represented Eastern New Mexico University of Portales, New Mexico, during the 1946 college football season. Led by head coach Al Garten, the Greyhounds compiled a 1–7–1 record (1–3 against NMC opponents), finished fourth in the NMC, and were outscored by a total of 209 to 46.

New Mexico Highlands
The 1946 New Mexico Highlands Cowboys football team represented New Mexico Highlands University of Las Vegas, New Mexico, during the 1946 college football season. The Cowboys compiled a 2–5 record (0–4 against NMC opponents), finished last in the NMC, and were outscored by a total of 99 to 38.

References